The 6×45mm SAW describes an experimental series of rimless bottlenecked intermediate cartridges developed in the 1970s for the U.S. Army. The cartridges were produced in a variety of sizes and from a variety of materials. The intent was to develop a cartridge that would replace all 5.56×45mm NATO weapons as well as most 7.62×51mm NATO rifles and machine guns in the U.S. military. Eventually, the 5.56mm was retained and only the machine gun portion of the SAW (Squad Automatic Weapon) competition was successful. That program led to the M249 light machine gun.

Note that the dimensions listed to the right are for 6×45mm SAW rounds. Three versions were produced for testing in the early 1970s. An aluminum-cased version was developed, as well as the about 5 mm longer 6mm SAW Long.

Design and development
During the 1970s, the U.S. Army was looking to develop a new squad automatic weapon (SAW) that was lighter than the M60 machine gun with an effective range out to 800 m. The 7.62 mm cartridge was too heavy and the 5.56 mm cartridge could not provide effective performance at that range. Research led to the development of the 6×45mm SAW cartridge. The relatively heavy bullet combined with a moderate velocity had optimum long-range performance. A light-alloy cased version of the round was also produced. Although the 6mm SAW's performance proved satisfactory, there were supply concerns over adopting a third rifle caliber. Development of the 6mm SAW was abandoned when an improved 5.56 mm round was promised, which arrived as the M855. 6×45mm SAW cartridges depending on their case materiel and bullet weigh .

Chambered firearms

Brunswick machine gun
Maremont XM233
Ford Aerospace XM234
Rodman Laboratories XM235
Ford Aerospace XM248

See also
.276 Pedersen - Another US Army experimental cartridge that never saw service
6mm Optimum
6×45mm - A 5.56×45mm necked up to accept 6mm bullets but with a smaller case head diameter when compared to the 6mm SAW
.22 Savage Hi-Power
5.8×42mm DBP87 The People's Republic of China standard issue cartridge
.243 Winchester
三八式実包

References

Pistol and rifle cartridges